Black Ink Crew is an American reality television series that premiered on January 7, 2013, on VH1.  It has aired ten seasons and chronicles the daily operations and staff drama at an African American–owned and operated tattoo shop in the Harlem neighborhood of New York City.

The show's success has resulted in similar spin-off series based in Chicago and Compton.

Production
Black Ink Crew second season premiered on September 23, 2013, with the season returning on March 31, 2014, for five more episodes.

The third season premiered on January 26, 2015, with the season returning August 24, 2015 for eight more episodes and a reunion special on October 19, 2015.

The show was renewed for a fourth season, which premiered on April 4, 2016. In December 2016, the series was renewed for a fifth season, which premiered on January 18, 2017. The sixth season premiered on December 6, 2017. On August 20, 2018, the series was renewed for a seventh season, which premiered on September 19, 2018, with the season returning March 13, 2019, for eight more episodes. On July 24, 2019, the series was renewed for an eighth season, which premiered on August 14, 2019, with the season returning on February 26, 2020 for ten more episodes. On March 8, 2021, the series was renewed for a ninth season, which premiered on April 19, 2021. The second half of season nine premiered on February 21, 2022.

On September 27, 2022, the series was renewed for a tenth season, which  premiered on October 18, 2022.

Cast

Main
 Ceaser (born David Emanuel; seasons 1–9, supporting in season 10), the owner of Black Ink in Harlem, New York, who also owns tattoo studios in Brooklyn, Atlanta, Orlando and Houston
 Dutchess (born Crystana Lattimore; seasons 1–5), a former tattoo artist for Black Ink and the owner of Pretty-N-Ink 
 O'Shit (censored onscreen as "O'S**t", born Richard Duncan; seasons 1–5, supporting in seasons 6–7, guest in seasons 8–9), a former tattoo artist at Black Ink
 Alex Estevez (seasons 1–2), a former receptionist at Black Ink
 Puma (born Paul Robinson; seasons 1–4, 8–10, supporting in season 7, guest in season 6), the former public relations manager at Black Ink and owner of Art2Ink
 Sassy (born Ashley Nicole Bermudez; seasons 1–3, supporting in season 4 & 8, guest in season 9), the former manager of Black Ink and manager of Art2Ink 
 Sky (born JaKeita Days; seasons 2–8, guest in season 1), the former receptionist at Black Ink and former manager of Black Ink Atlanta
 Teddy Ruks (born Shariff Homer; seasons 4–10, supporting in seasons 1–3), the former assistant manager at Black Ink and Ceaser's cousin
 Donna Marie Lombardi (born Taylor Pinckney; seasons 4–9, supporting in season 3), a former apprentice of Ceaser and Dutchess, tattoo artist and piercer for Art2Ink
 Melody Mitchell (seasons 6–7, supporting in seasons 4–5), a former tattoo artist and manager at Black Ink
 Walter Miller (seasons 6–9, supporting in seasons 1–5), the assistant manager of Black Ink 113th
 Young Bae (seasons 6–10, supporting in season 5), a tattoo artist at Black Ink
 Miss Kitty (born Karis Phillips; season 8, supporting in seasons 5–7), the former brand ambassador for Black Ink
 Tatiana Ritter (seasons 9–10, supporting in seasons 6–8), the manager for Black Ink
 Alex (season 10, supporting in seasons 6–9), a tattoo artist at Black Ink 
 Spyder (season 10, supporting in season 9), a tattoo artist at Black Ink

Cast timeline

Note:

Episodes

See also
List of tattoo TV shows

References

External links

 
2010s American reality television series
2020s American reality television series
2013 American television series debuts
English-language television shows
Television series set in tattoo shops
Television shows set in New York City
VH1 original programming